Codonorhiza is a genus of flowering plants belonging to the family Iridaceae.

Its native range is South African Republic.

Species:

Codonorhiza azurea 
Codonorhiza corymbosa 
Codonorhiza elandsmontana 
Codonorhiza falcata 
Codonorhiza fastigiata 
Codonorhiza micrantha 
Codonorhiza pillansii

References

Iridaceae
Iridaceae genera